Maciej Lewenstein (born September 21, 1955 in Warsaw), is a Polish theoretical physicist, currently an ICREA professor at ICFO – The Institute of Photonic Sciences in Castelldefels near Barcelona. He is an author of over 480 scientific articles and 2 books, and recipient of many international and national prizes. In addition to quantum physics his other passion is music, and jazz in particular. His collection of compact discs and vinyl records includes over 9000 items.

Education
Maciej Lewenstein was born on 21.09.1955. He graduated at the Institute for Theoretical Physics at Warsaw University in 1978, with his diploma thesis about the superradiance phenomenon written under the supervision of Prof. . After one year of working as a scientific assistant at the ITP of Warsaw University, he joined in 1979 the new Centre for Theoretical Physics of the Polish Academy of Sciences in Warsaw (CFT), newly formed by Prof. Iwo Białynicki-Birula. At CFT he started his PhD studies on applications of functional integration methods in quantum optics with Prof. K. Rzążewski. In 1981 he became a DAAD stipend holder at the Essen University. There, he completed his thesis under the joint supervision of Prof. Fritz Haake in 1983 with summa cum laude and the Prize of the University. In the years 1984-1986 he spent long term visits as a postdoc at Essen University with Prof. Haake working on statistical physics of disordered systems. After returning to Poland and becoming a faculty member of the CFT, he habilitated in 1986 at the Institute of Physics in Warsaw with a thesis on cavity quantum electrodynamics and intense laser-matter interactions.

Research career
After habilitating, he was for three years a research associate to the Nobel laureate Roy J. Glauber at Harvard University. In the beginning of the nineties he continued to extend his collaborations on quantum optics of dielectric media and cavity quantum electrodynamics with Prof. R. Glauber, as well as Prof. T. Mossberg (Eugene, Oregon). Due to his interdisciplinary interest applications of physics in neurosciences and social sciences, he has become an associated member of the Institute of Social Sciences at the Warsaw University (ISS), and developed collaborations with Profs. A Nowak and B. Latané (ISS/Boca Raton). In 1992 he spent a six-month sabbatical at the Service de Photons, Atomes et Molécules (SPAM) of the Commisariat a l’Energie Atomique in Saclay. There he started his investigations of the foundations of the atto-second physics and harmonic generation together with Prof. A. L’Huillier. In 1993 he spent a year as a visiting fellow at Joint Institute for Laboratory Astrophysics at Boulder, where he has continued the work on atto-second physics, but initiated also his interests in physics of ultra-cold atoms and quantum information, running a joint Bose-Einstein Condensation seminar together with Profs. P. Zoller and E. Cornell (Nobel 2001). In 1994 he spent six months at the Institute for Theoretical Atomic and Molecular Physics at the Harvard-Smithsonian Center for Astrophysics, continuing studies of ultra-cold gases with R. Glauber.

In 1995 he joined the faculty of the SPAM CEA in Saclay, where he spent 3.5 years dividing his interest between physics of ultra-intense laser-matter interactions, atto-second physics, physics of ultra-cold gases and quantum information. In 1998 he became a full professor at the Leibniz University Hannover, where he remained until 2005. In 2005 he moved to Spain as ICREA professor to lead the quantum optics theory group at the Institut de Ciències Fotòniques (ICFO) in Castelldefels.

Research interests
His research interests are extremely wide and include physics of ultra-cold gases (Bose-Einstein condensation, quantum dynamics of degenerate gases, laser induced condensation, theory of master equation and open systems for many body systems, ultra-cold Fermi gases, strongly correlated atomic and molecular systems, ultra-cold disordered and frustrated gases, ultra-cold dipolar gases, ultra-cold gases and quantum gauge theories), Quantum Information (theory of entanglement; implementations in quantum optical systems, quantum communications, quantum cryptography, quantum computers, quantum networks and entanglement percolation), Statistical Physics (stochastic processes; dynamical critical phenomena, spin glasses and disordered systems; statistical physics of neural networks; complex systems; interdisciplinary applications of statistical physics in neurophysiology, cognitive science and social psychology), Mathematical Physics (mathematical foundations of quantum mechanics and entanglement theory, rigorous statistical mechanics), Laser-matter interactions (interactions of intense laser with atoms, molecules, and plasmas; new sources of coherent XUV radiation and X-rays; ultrafast phenomena in atoms, molecules and solid state, atto-second physics, classical and complex dynamics of atomic systems), Quantum Optics (cavity quantum electrodynamics; cooling and trapping of atoms,  non-classical states of light and matter; foundations of quantum mechanics; classical and quantum stochastic processes).

Publications, prizes, etc.
Lewenstein conducted successful research in above mentioned areas and is author of over 480 publications, including over 80 Phys. Rev. Lett., feature and invited articles in Science and Nature group journals, and several reviews. (Web of Science). Lewenstein is an author of two books:

Polish Jazz Recordings and Beyond Maciej Lewenstein Warszawska Firma Wydawnicza (2015)

Ultracold atoms in optical lattices: Simulating quantum many-body systems Maciej Lewenstein, Anna Sanpera, and Veronica Ahufunger, Oxford University Press(2012).

In 2004 he became a Fellow of the American Physical Society and in 2007 he has obtained the Alexander von Humboldt Research Prize. In 2008 he became a recipient of the ERC Advanced Grant QUGATUA. In 2010 he obtained the Prize of the Joachim Herz Foundation of University of Hamburg. In 2011 he received the Prize of the Foundation for Polish Science, in 2013, Gutenberg Prize of University of Mainz, EPS Prize of the Quantum Optics and Electronics Division, and the second advanced ERC Advanced Grant OSYRIS. He was invited to the most prestigious conferences of his research area (Nobel Symposium, Bi-annual Bose Einstein Conference, International Atomic Physics Conference, APS and DFG Annual Meetings). He has organized over 30 international meetings and conferences.

Community services, teaching
He serves a reviewer in the most prominent journals, including Science, Nature and Nature Physics. He served as Division Associate Editor of Physical Review Letters from 1997-2003. He is on the editorial board of “Open Systems and Information Dynamics” and “Reports on Progress in Physics”. He was the Chairman of the Quantum Optics and Photonics Division of the German Physical Society in 2004-2006. He has been teaching and lecturing all parts of the theoretical physics curriculum and has supervised 17 Diploma and 29 PhD theses at various institutions. He has supervised over 40 post-docs and provides services as a reviewer and evaluator for several national and international research funding agencies (EU, NSF, EPSRC, Royal Society, DFG, AvH Foundations and their counterparts in Australia, Israel etc.) and for various universities and research institutions.

Significant Awards
2004 – Fellow of the American Physical Society
2007 – Humboldt Research Award
2008 – European Research Council Advanced Grant
2010 – Joachim Herz Foundation Prize of University of Hamburg
2011 – Prize of the Foundation for Polish Science
2013 – Johannes Gutenberg Prize of University of Mainz
2013 – European Research Council Advanced Grant
2013 – European Physical Society Quantum Optics and Electronic Division Prize for Fundamental Research
2014 – Listed among Thomson Reuters Highly Cited Researchers 2014
2014 – Listed among Thomson Reuters 2014 The World's Most Influential Scientific Minds
2016 – RSEF Medal
2016 – 
2019 - Member of the Academia Europaea

References

External links

Maciej Lewenstein: Short Profile at ICFO 
ICFO-Quantum Optics Theory group 
ICREA - Institució Catalana de Recerca i Estudis Avançats
The Gutenberg Research college honours the achievements of Maciej Lewenstein 
Maciej Lewenstein Elita Czyta (polish)

1955 births
Living people
20th-century Polish physicists
University of Warsaw alumni
Polish emigrants to Spain
Fellows of the American Physical Society
Humboldt Research Award recipients
Members of Academia Europaea
Members of the European Academy of Sciences and Arts